John Edward Baker (9 December 1891 – 18 January 1952) was an Australian rules footballer who played with Geelong in the Victorian Football League (VFL).

Notes

External links 

1891 births
1952 deaths
People educated at Geelong College
Australian rules footballers from Victoria (Australia)
Australian Rules footballers: place kick exponents
Geelong Football Club players